Michael John Kenning (born 18 August 1940 in Erdington, Warwickshire, England), is an English footballer who played as a winger in the Football League.He is married to Gill Kenning and has two children namely Paul Kenning and Gary Kenning and 5 grandchildren namely Aiden, Devon, Kyle, Jemma, Tayla

References

External links
Mike Kenning's Career

1940 births
People from Erdington
Living people
English footballers
Association football midfielders
Charlton Athletic F.C. players
Aston Villa F.C. players
Shrewsbury Town F.C. players
Norwich City F.C. players
Wolverhampton Wanderers F.C. players
Watford F.C. players
Atherstone Town F.C. players
English Football League players
Footballers from Birmingham, West Midlands